White Breast Township is a township in Warren County, Iowa, USA.

History
White Breast Township was organized in 1851.

References

Townships in Warren County, Iowa
Townships in Iowa
1851 establishments in Iowa